Harrison Requa "Jimmy" Johnston (August 31, 1896 – November 18, 1969) was an American amateur golfer.

Early life
Johnston was born in Saint Paul, Minnesota on August 31, 1896. He was the son of architect Clarence H. Johnston Sr. and Mary "May" Johnston (née Thurston).

Golf career
Johnston won the Minnesota State Amateur title seven straight years (1921–1927) and won the Minnesota State Open twice (1927–28). He was elected to the Minnesota Golf Hall of Fame in 1988.

Johnston's biggest win came at the 1929 U.S. Amateur where he beat Oscar Willing, 4 and 3, at Pebble Beach Golf Links.

Johnston played on four winning Walker Cup teams: 1923, 1924, 1928, and 1930. He was also a member of the 1932 team but did not play in any matches.

Johnston led the 1927 U.S. Open after two rounds but slipped to tie for 19th after a third round 87.

Personal life
Johnston served in the Army in both World War I and World War II.

He died on November 18, 1969 in Palm Beach County, Florida. He was buried at Fort Snelling National Cemetery in Minneapolis, Minnesota.

Tournament wins
1921 Minnesota State Amateur
1922 Minnesota State Amateur
1923 Minnesota State Amateur
1924 Western Amateur, Minnesota State Amateur
1925 Minnesota State Amateur
1926 Minnesota State Amateur
1927 Minnesota State Amateur, Minnesota State Open
1928 Minnesota State Open
1929 U.S. Amateur

References

American male golfers
Amateur golfers
Golfers from Minnesota
Sportspeople from Saint Paul, Minnesota
United States Army personnel of World War I
United States Army personnel of World War II
1896 births
1969 deaths